Ahmed Mourad Salah El-Din Zulfikar (15 August 1952 – 1 May 2010) was an Egyptian mechanical engineer and entrepreneur. He worked for three decades in the field of infrastructure. Zulfikar was one of the first founders of the modern irrigation systems technology in Egypt.

Early life and education 
Ahmed Mourad Salah El-Din Zulfikar was born on 15 August 1952, in Abbassia neighborhood of Cairo to a well-off family. His father was the actor and producer Salah Zulfikar, a police officer at the time, and his mother was Mrs. Nafisa Bahgat. He has one sister, Mona Zulficar, a lawyer. 

Despite growing up in the midst of an artistic family, his father, Salah Zulfikar, a famous actor, and his uncles, Ezz El Dine Zulfikar and Mahmoud Zulfikar, were famous directors and producers in Egyptian cinema at the time, Zulfikar was not enthusiastic about working in the movie business and chose another path away from fame and became what he always wished for, to be an engineer. He received his BA in Mechanical Engineering from Ain Shams University in 1976.

Career 
Ahmed Zulfikar helped introduce modern irrigation technology in Egypt. He began his career in Arab Contractors. He worked as a site engineer for 3 years.In 1979, Zulfikar resigned from working for Arab Contractors and traveled to Germany for studying modern irrigation technology and returned to Egypt after a year to establish his first private corporation TOCEG Misr at the age of 27 years.

Zulfikar worked for over three decades in the design and construction of modern irrigation systems and had a major role in converting tens of thousands of acres from flood irrigation to modern irrigation in the period from 1979 to 2010. He participated in the establishment of golf courses with automated irrigation systems according to international standards. He was involved with landscaping projects in hotels and resorts all over Egypt.

Positions held 
 Founder and Chairman of the Board of Directors of TOCEG Misr (1979-1994).
 Member of the Board of Directors of the Egyptian Center for Agricultural Services (1992-2002).
 Consultant for Inter Group and plenty of agricultural institutions in Egypt (1998-2010).
 Founder and Chairman of the Board of Directors of the Egyptian Company for Contracting and Modern Irrigation ECMI (2000-2010).

Personal life 
Ahmed Zulfikar married Mrs. Inas El Imam in Cairo in 1978 and the couple remained happily married until his death in 2010. Together they had two sons, Salah and Karim. The elder; Salah Zulfikar is a corporate regional director and the younger; Karim Zulfikar is a businessman owning his own corporation.

Zulfikar died of a sudden heart attack at the age of 57 on Saturday, 1 May 2010 in Cairo, Egypt.

See also 
 Economy of Egypt
 List of Egyptians

References 

1952 births
Egyptian businesspeople
2010 deaths
Egyptian engineers
Ain Shams University alumni